Fides Romanin (12 November 1934 – 23 October 2019) was an Italian cross-country skier who competed in the 1950s.

She was born in Forni Avoltri.

She competed in two Winter Olympics, serving as flag bearer for the Italian team at Oslo in 1952. Romanin finished 17th in the women's 10 km in Oslo.

Romanin also competed in the 1956 Winter Olympics in Cortina d'Ampezzo, finishing 31st in the 10 km and eighth in the 3 × 5 km relay.

After her 1959 retirement, Romanin married and raised four children. While a mother, she remained active in nordic skiing, providing an inspiration for future women skiers that included Manuela Di Centa, Bice Vanzetta, Gabriella Paruzzi, and Stefania Belmondo.

Cross-country skiing results

Olympic Games

Italian National Championships
 1951: 2nd, Italian women's championships of cross-country skiing, 10 km
 1952: 3rd, Italian women's championships of cross-country skiing, 10 km
 1955: 3rd, Italian women's championships of cross-country skiing, 10 km
 1957: 2nd, Italian women's championships of cross-country skiing, 10 km
 1958: 2nd, Italian women's championships of cross-country skiing, 10 km
 1959: 3rd, Italian women's championships of cross-country skiing, 10 km

References

External links
Biography of Romanin 

1934 births
2019 deaths
Italian female cross-country skiers
Olympic cross-country skiers of Italy
Cross-country skiers at the 1952 Winter Olympics
Cross-country skiers at the 1956 Winter Olympics
People from the Province of Udine
Sportspeople from Friuli-Venezia Giulia